Christopher Paul LiPuma (born March 23, 1971) is an American former professional ice hockey defenseman.

Biography
LiPuma was born in Chicago, Illinois. As a youth, he played in the 1984 Quebec International Pee-Wee Hockey Tournament with the Chicago Young Americans minor ice hockey team.

LiPuma played 72 games in the National Hockey League: 64 with the Tampa Bay Lightning and eight with the San Jose Sharks.

He is also well known for his play in the International Hockey League.

Career statistics

Regular season and playoffs

References

External links

1971 births
American men's ice hockey defensemen
Atlanta Knights players
Baton Rouge Kingfish players
Chicago Wolves (IHL) players
Ice hockey people from Chicago
Kentucky Thoroughblades players
Kitchener Rangers players
Living people
Nashville Knights players
Orlando Seals (ACHL) players
Orlando Seals (WHA2) players
Orlando Solar Bears (IHL) players
San Antonio Dragons players
San Jose Sharks players
Tampa Bay Lightning players
Undrafted National Hockey League players